ISO 3166-2:SV is the entry for El Salvador in ISO 3166-2, part of the ISO 3166 standard published by the International Organization for Standardization (ISO), which defines codes for the names of the principal subdivisions (e.g., provinces or states) of all countries coded in ISO 3166-1.

Currently for El Salvador, ISO 3166-2 codes are defined for 14 departments.

Each code consists of two parts, separated by a hyphen. The second part is two letters.

Current codes
Subdivision names are listed as in the ISO 3166-2 standard published by the ISO 3166 Maintenance Agency (ISO 3166/MA).

Subdivision names are sorted in Spanish alphabetical order: a-n, ñ, o-z.

Click on the button in the header to sort each column.

See also
 Subdivisions of El Salvador
 FIPS region codes of El Salvador

External links
 ISO Online Browsing Platform: SV
 Departments of El Salvador, Statoids.com

2:SV
ISO 3166-2
El Salvador geography-related lists